The House of Sombrerete (Spanish: Corrala de Sombrerete) is a building located in Madrid, Spain. It was declared Bien de Interés Cultural in 1978.

References 

Buildings and structures in Embajadores neighborhood, Madrid
Houses in Spain
Bien de Interés Cultural landmarks in Madrid